Djibo is a surname of Nigerien origin. Notable people with the surname include:
Amadou Ali Djibo, Nigerien politician
Fatou Djibo (1927–2016), Nigerien women's rights activist, feminist, educator and trade unionist
Fatouma Bintou Djibo, Burkinabé women diplomat
Hamidou Djibo (born 1985), Nigerien football striker
Salou Djibo (born 1965), Nigerien Army officer

Surnames of West African origin
Surnames of Nigerien origin